Jaeckel is a surname. Notable people with the surname include:

Antonie Jaeckel (1876–1960), German actress
Barry Jaeckel (born 1949), American professional golfer
Egbert Jaeckel (1919–1943), Hauptmann in the Luftwaffe during World War II
Gunther Jaeckel, New York City furrier
Jake Jaeckel (born 1942), former American baseball pitcher
John P. Jaeckel (1865–1941), American politician
Peter Jaeckel, mathematician, and finance academic and practitioner
Richard Jaeckel (1926–1997), American actor of film and television
Tracy Jaeckel (1905–1969), American fencer

See also

Jackel (disambiguation)

German-language surnames